Michurinsky Prospekt is a station on the Kalininsko-Solntsevskaya line of the Moscow Metro, it opened on 30 August 2018 as part of line's "Ramenki" - "Rasskazovka" extension.

It has a connection to Michurinsky Prospekt on the Bolshaya Koltsevaya line, a planned orbital metro line. That station is opened on 7 December 2021.

Public art
Constructed by the China Railway Construction Corporation (CRCC), the station features unique design elements which are heavily influenced by Chinese culture, as part of a collaboration with the company.

References

Moscow Metro stations
Kalininsko-Solntsevskaya line
Bolshaya Koltsevaya line
Railway stations in Russia opened in 2018
Railway stations located underground in Russia